Nokshino is a rural locality (a village) in Yudinskoye Rural Settlement, Velikoustyugsky District, Vologda Oblast, Russia. The population was 17 as of 2002.

Geography 
Nokshino is located 10 km northeast of Veliky Ustyug (the district's administrative centre) by road. Zayamzha is the nearest rural locality.

References 

Rural localities in Velikoustyugsky District